During the 1968–69 English football season, Brentford competed in the Football League Fourth Division. Off the back of 18 months of extreme financial problems, the club finished in mid-table.

Season summary 
After two tumultuous seasons off the pitch, a continued cash crisis meant that during the 1968 off-season, Brentford manager Jimmy Sirrel would not be provided with the funds to buy players who could guarantee a lasting run at promotion from the Fourth Division. He was able to plug the gaps in his threadbare squad, bringing in full back Denis Hunt and journeyman forwards Pat Terry and Peter Deakin. A need to balance the books led to Ian Lawther (one of the club's most consistent goalscorers since the 1964–65 season) being sold for a £3,000 fee a matter of days before the beginning of the season.

Manager Sirrel's young team began the season in promising form, losing just two of the first 15 league matches to consolidate a position in the top six. Brentford's position belied the club's personnel problems, with a growing catalogue of injuries, illness and suspensions. £10,000 was spent on Arsenal winger Gordon Neilson in October 1968, an extravagant amount given Brentford's financial problems. An inconsistent spell between November 1968 and April 1969 dropped the Bees as low as 19th, two places above the re-election zone, but six wins in the final seven matches of the season lifted the club to an 11th-place finish.

League table

Results
Brentford's goal tally listed first.

Legend

Football League Fourth Division

FA Cup

Football League Cup 

 Sources: 100 Years Of Brentford, Statto

Playing squad 
Players' ages are as of the opening day of the 1968–69 season.

 Sources: 100 Years Of Brentford, Timeless Bees

Coaching staff

Statistics

Appearances and goals
Substitute appearances in brackets.

Players listed in italics left the club mid-season.
Source: 100 Years Of Brentford

Goalscorers 

Players listed in italics left the club mid-season.
Source: 100 Years Of Brentford

Management

Summary

Transfers & loans

Notes

References 

Brentford F.C. seasons
Brentford